Fristoe is an unincorporated community in Benton County, Missouri, United States.

The Pomme de Terre River arm of Harry S Truman Reservoir lies approximately four miles to the west along Missouri Route CC.

History
A post office called Fristoe was established in 1895, and remained in operation until 1978. The community was named for Judge Markham Fristoe, an early member of the county court.

The Rodgers Shelter Archeological Site was listed on the National Register of Historic Places in 1969.

References

Unincorporated communities in Benton County, Missouri
Unincorporated communities in Missouri